Stonewall Jackson "Jack" Beach (1862 – July 23, 1896) was a Major League Baseball outfielder who played two seasons in professional baseball, one at the Major League level.

Professional career

Washington Nationals
In his only season at the Major League level, Beach hit .097 with three hits and two doubles in eight games.

Virginia League
In , Beach played one more season in professional baseball, this time with a local team in the Virginia League. With the Lynchburg, Virginia baseball club he played his final season.

External links
Career statistics and player information from Baseball-Reference and Baseball-Reference (Minors)

1862 births
1896 deaths
Washington Nationals (AA) players
Major League Baseball outfielders
Baseball players from Virginia
Lynchburg (minor league baseball) players
19th-century baseball players
Sportspeople from Alexandria, Virginia
People born in the Confederate States